P.A. (short for Parental Advisory) was a Southern hip hop trio, part of the Atlanta-based Dungeon Family. The group composed of rappers/producers James "Mello" Hollins, Kawan "K.P." Prather and Maurice "Big Reese" Sinclair. In 1993, they released their debut studio album, Ghetto Street Funk. In 1998, they released their second full-length titled Straight No Chase via DreamWorks Records. The single "Like We Do" became a southern anthem while the group's second single, "Reservations" secured a spot on the Blade (soundtrack) earning the group a Gold Record for the soundtrack. My Life, Your Entertainment was the group's third album overall and their second record distributed by DreamWorks as well. The single "Sundown" featuring 8Ball filled the southeastern airwaves while BET played the video in heavy rotation.

Discography

Studio albums

Singles

Production
YoungBloodZ: "85 / Billy Dee Interlude", "It's the Money / Fake ID Interlude", "Booty Club Playa" from Against da Grain (1999)
Mystikal: "Come See About Me" from Let's Get Ready (2000)
T.I. & Beanie Sigel: "2 Glock 9's" from Music from and Inspired by Shaft (2000)
Pink: "Do What U Do" from Can't Take Me Home (2000)
Rehab: "Escape Intro", "Storm Chaser", "Rattle My Cage" from Southern Discomfort (2000)

References

External links
Parental Advisory at AllMusic
Parental Advisory at Discogs

American musical trios
Dungeon Family members
Southern hip hop groups
MCA Records artists